Michael Chiaka Douglass Okwu is a Nigerian American journalist, television personality, and media entrepreneur.

Early life and education

Michael Okwu was born in Imo State in southeastern Nigeria. His father and mother, a diplomat and educator respectively raised Michael and his four brothers abroad in London, Washington DC, and Dar es Salaam before the family fled as refugees of the Biafran Crisis and permanently re-settled in the United States.  Okwu was schooled at St Aedan's Parochial School and Phillips Exeter Academy, and studied Government at Harvard University where he was an editor of the Crimson, a soccer player and a sprinter on the track team.

Career
After graduating Okwu moved to New York to accept a paid internship on the CBS news magazine "West 57th".  He was later hired by CNN where he worked as a production assistant, assignment editor, and field producer before becoming a correspondent and anchor. In 1998, he was assigned to work on CNN NewsStand,  the network's prime time news magazine. He also hosted the entertainment unit's Showbiz Today reports, interviewing and profiling artists and celebrities, and later served as an anchor for Diplomatic License, a weekly world affairs program centered on the United Nations. He has been cited for his live reports from Ground Zero following the attacks on 9/11, and his U-N coverage preceding the second Iraq war.

From 2004 to 2010 Okwu was a Los Angeles based correspondent for NBC News appearing regularly on Today, NBC Nightly News with Brian Williams and MSNBC. He also filed special reports for Dateline and long form segments for CNBC's Business Nation. He worked across North America, Europe, and Asia including the US Olympic track and field steroids scandal, Britain's 2005 royal wedding and parliamentary elections, the papal conclave following the death of Pope Paul II, the 2008 presidential election of Barack Obama, and the death of Michael Jackson.

In 2010, he moved on to host interview specials on public television in California and contributed long-form reports for So-Cal Connected. Episodes included profiles of local figures like jazz musician Herbie Hancock and chef Thomas Keller as well as reports on the rising black market for prescription drugs, the new age of eco-terrorism and animal rights extremism.

As a national correspondent and special host for America Tonight, Al Jazeera America's flagship news magazine show, Okwu travelled to towns in and around the exclusion zone in Fukushima for a series of reports about how the nuclear disaster changed life in Japan. He anchored special broadcasts about California's years long drought, a retrospective about the Watts riots, and an investigation on forced arbitration.

Okwu is currently developing multi platform content including several internationally syndicated television series.

Okwu also serves as news anchor for Deutsche Welle's English-language bureau, DW News.

Personal life
Michael Okwu is married to Jeanette Okwu a digital and social media marketer for Spark44. He is the father of one daughter.

Awards
Okwu is the winner of three Emmys and Cable Ace Awards, five LA Press Awards, a National Headliner Award, and a features prize from the National Association of Black Journalists.

References

External links
 So-Cal Connected at https://www.kcet.org/shows/socal-connected
 Jeanette Okwu on https://www.linkedin.com/in/jeanetteokwu
 Spark44 at http://spark44.com/

Harvard Crimson men's soccer players
Living people
Phillips Exeter Academy alumni
Harvard Crimson men's track and field athletes
American male journalists
Association footballers not categorized by position
Year of birth missing (living people)
Association football players not categorized by nationality